Allium setifolium is an Asian species of wild onion native to Xinjiang, Kazakhstan, Kyrgyzstan and Mongolia. It occurs in desert regions at elevations of 400–1000 m.

Allium setifolium is well-adapted to life in a hot, arid environment. It has a cluster of narrow, egg-shaped bulbs each up to 10 mm in diameter. Scape is very short for the genus, rarely more than 10 cm tall. Leaves are reduced to hair-like bristles only 200-300 μm in diameter. Umbel has only a few red flowers.

References

setifolium
Onions
Flora of temperate Asia
Plants described in 1841